Dmitriyevka is a rural locality (a village) in Yefremkinsky Selsoviet, Karmaskalinsky District, Bashkortostan, Russia. The population was 205 as of 2010. There are 2 streets.

Geography 
Dmitriyevka is located 18 km southeast of Karmaskaly (the district's administrative centre) by road. Yefremkino is the nearest rural locality.

References 

Rural localities in Karmaskalinsky District